Microtus is a genus of voles found in North America, Europe and northern Asia. The genus name refers to the small ears of these animals. About 62 species are placed in the genus.
They are stout rodents with short ears, legs and tails. They eat green vegetation such as grasses and sedges in summer, and grains, seeds, root and bark at other times. The genus is also called "meadow voles". (ITIS database)

The species are:
Insular vole  (M. abbreviatus)
California vole (M. californicus)
Rock vole (M. chrotorrhinus)
Long-tailed vole (M. longicaudus)
Mexican vole (M. mexicanus)
Singing vole (M. miurus)
Mogollon vole (M. mogollonensis)
Water vole (M. richardsoni)
Zempoaltépec vole (M. umbrosus)
Taiga vole (M. xanthognathus)
Subgenus Microtus
Short-tailed field vole (M. agrestis)
Anatolian vole (M. anatolicus)
Common vole (M. arvalis)
Cabrera's vole (M. cabrerae)
Doğramaci's vole (M. dogramacii)
Elbeyli vole (M. elbeyli)
Günther's vole (M. guentheri)
Harting's vole (M. hartingii)
Tien Shan vole (M. ilaeus)
Persian vole (M. irani)
Mediterranean field vole (M. lavernedii)
Kerman vole (Microtus kermanensis)
Turkish vole (M. lydius)
East European vole (M. mystacinus)
Altai vole (M. obscurus)
Paradox vole (M. paradoxus)
Qazvin vole (M. qazvinensis)
Portuguese field vole (M. rosianus)
Schidlovsky's vole (M. schidlovskii)
Social vole (M. socialis)
Transcaspian vole (M. transcaspicus)
Subgenus Blanfordimys

 Afghan vole (M. afghanus)
 Bucharian vole (M. bucharicus)
Juniper vole (M. juldaschi)

Subgenus Terricola
Bavarian pine vole (M. bavaricus)
Calabria pine vole (M. brachycercus) 
Daghestan pine vole  (M. daghestanicus)
Mediterranean pine vole (M. duodecimcostatus)
Felten's vole (M. felteni)
Gerbe's vole (M. gerbii)
Liechtenstein's pine vole (M. liechtensteini)
Lusitanian pine vole (M. lusitanicus)
Major's pine vole (M. majori)
Alpine pine vole (M. multiplex)
Sicilian pine vole (M. nebrodensis)
Savi's pine vole (M. savii)
European pine vole (M. subterraneus)
Tatra pine vole (M. tatricus)
Thomas's pine vole (M. thomasi)
Subgenus MynomesGray-tailed vole (M. canicaudus)
Western meadow vole (M. drummondi)
Florida salt marsh vole (M. dukecampbelli)
Montane vole (M. montanus)
Creeping vole (M. oregoni)
Eastern meadow vole (M. pennsylvanicus)
Townsend's vole (M. townsendii)
Subgenus AlexandromysClarke's vole (M. clarkei)
Evorsk vole (M. evoronensis)
Reed vole (M. fortis)
Taiwan vole (M. kikuchii)
Lacustrine vole (M. limnophilus)
Maximowicz's vole (M. maximowiczii)
Middendorf's vole (M. middendorffi)
Mongolian vole (M. mongolicus)
Japanese grass vole (M. montebelli)
Muisk vole (M. mujanensis)
Tundra vole or root vole (M. oeconomus) - several subspecies
Sakhalin vole (M. sachalinensis)
Subgenus StenocraniusNarrow-headed vole (M. gregalis)
Subgenus PitymysGuatemalan vole (M. guatemalensis)
Tarabundí vole (M. oaxacensis)
Woodland vole (M. pinetorum)
Jalapan pine vole (M. quasiater)
Subgenus PedomysPrairie vole (M. ochrogaster)
Subgenus HyrcanicolaSchelkovnikov's pine vole (M. schelkovnikovi'')

References
 (online database version entry for Muroidea).

External links
Genus Microtus

 
Voles and lemmings
Rodent genera
Taxa named by Franz von Paula Schrank
Extant Piacenzian first appearances